Daniel Ojeda (born February 23, 1986) is a Colombian soccer player. He currently plays for Bayamon FC in the Puerto Rico Soccer League.

Career
Ojeda began his career playing for the Bogota-based club Academia in the Colombian Categoría Primera B, before moving to the Puerto Rico Islanders in 2007. He played primarily on the Islanders’ reserve team in his debut season, before being called up to the first team in 2008; he has since made over 20 appearances, helping the Islanders win the 2008 USL First Division regular season title and progress to the semi finals of the CONCACAF Champions League 2008–09. In 2009, Ojeda's playing time with the Puerto Rico Islanders decreased and he was loaned out to Bayamon FC in the Puerto Rico Soccer League. In 2010, he made his official move with Bayamon FC, terminating his contract with the Puerto Rico Islanders.

Honors

Club

Puerto Rico Islanders
 USL First Division Championship runners-up: 2008
 Commissioner's Cup: 2008
 CFU Club Championship runner-up: 2009

Bayamon FC
 Puerto Rico Soccer League PlayOff Cup: 2009

External links
Puerto Rico Islanders bio

1986 births
Living people
Colombian footballers
Academia F.C. players
Puerto Rico Islanders players
Bayamón FC players
USL First Division players
Colombian expatriate footballers
Expatriate footballers in Puerto Rico
Association football defenders
People from Santa Marta
Sportspeople from Magdalena Department